Phaonia rufiventris is a fly from the family Muscidae. It is found in the Palearctic.

References

External links
Seguy, E. (1923) Diptères Anthomyides. Paris: Éditions Faune de France Faune n° 6 393 p., 813 fig.Bibliotheque Virtuelle Numerique  pdf

Muscidae
Diptera of Europe
Insects described in 1763
Taxa named by Giovanni Antonio Scopoli